The Trial of Joan of Arc at Rouen, 1431 is an adaptation by the German dramatist Bertolt Brecht of a radio play by Anna Seghers. It was written in collaboration with Benno Besson and premiered at the Berliner Ensemble in November 1952, in a production directed by Besson (his first important production with the Ensemble), with Käthe Reichel as Joan.

Characters

 Joan of Arc
 Bishop Cauchon of Beauvais
 Jean Beaupère
 Jean de la Fontaine
 Jean de Chatillon (Chation)
 Guillaume Manchon
 Jean d'Estivet
 Jean Lefèvre
 Jean Massieu
 Raoul de Rinel
 A Clerk
 The Executioner
 Nuns
 An English Observer
 His Adjutant
 Guards of Joan of Arc
 English Soldiers
 Two Peasant Girls
 Jacques Legrain

 Peasant
 Peasant Woman
 Son
 Sister-in-law
 Child
 Fishwife
 Dr. Dufour
 His Two Nieces
 Well-dressed Gentleman
 Loose Woman
 Wine Merchant
 Innkeeper
 Young Curate
 War Cripple
 Grandfather Breuil
 His Grandson
 Children
 People

References

Sources
 Willett, John. 1959. The Theatre of Bertolt Brecht: A Study from Eight Aspects. London: Methuen. .
 Willett, John, and Ralph Manheim, eds. 1972. Collected Plays: Nine. By Bertolt Brecht. Bertolt Brecht: Plays, Poetry, Prose Ser. New York: Vintage. .

Plays by Bertolt Brecht
Works about Joan of Arc
Plays based on real people